This is a list of women photographers who were born in Nigeria or whose works are closely associated with that country.

A
 Fati Abubakar (fl 2000s), photojournalist and documentary photographer
 Jenevieve Aken (born 1989), documentary and urban portrait photographer
 Lola Akinmade Åkerström (fl 2006), photographer and travel writer based in Stockholm
 Aisha Augie-Kuta (born 1980), photographer, filmmaker
 Yetunde Ayeni-Babaeko (born 1978), commercial photographer

B
 TY Bello (born 1978), singer and photographer

E 
 Sokari Ekine (born 1949), activist, blogger, author and photographer
 Yagazie Emezi (born 1989), artist and photojournalist

F 
 Fati Abubakar, documentary photographer

N
 Emily Nkanga (born 1995), Nigerian-British photographer and filmmaker
 Amarachi Nwosu (born 1994), Nigerian-American photographer, artist and filmmaker

O
 Ifeoma Onyefulu (born 1959), children's author, novelist, photographer

S
 Taiye Selasi (born 1979), writer, photographer

See also
 List of women photographers

References

-
Nigerian women photographers, List of
Photographers, List of Nigerian
Photographers